Ghriss is a town and commune in Mascara Province, Algeria. According to the 1998 census it has a population of 22,151. Nearby cities and villages : Froha, Matemore and Tizi. Official language : Arabic : غريس.

Ghriss is widely used in north African countries and have other origins.

Notable residents  
Zahia Dehar (1992) Fashion Model and Designer.

References

Communes of Mascara Province
Mascara Province